Lee Majors (born Harvey Lee Yeary; April 23, 1939) is an American actor. Majors portrayed the characters of Heath Barkley in the American television Western series The Big Valley (1965–1969), Colonel Steve Austin in the American television science fiction action series The Six Million Dollar Man (1973–1978), and Colt Seavers in American television action series The Fall Guy (1981–1986).

Early life
Majors was born in Wyandotte, Michigan, a suburb of Detroit. His parents, Carl and Alice Yeary, were both killed in separate accidents. (His father died in a work accident six months prior to his birth, and his mother was killed in a car accident when he was almost eighteen months old.) At the age of two, Majors was adopted by his uncle and aunt, Harvey and Mildred Yeary, and he moved with them to Middlesboro, Kentucky.

He participated in track and football at Middlesboro High School. He graduated in 1957, and earned a scholarship to Indiana University, where he again competed in sports. Majors transferred to Eastern Kentucky University in Richmond, Kentucky, in 1959. He played in his first football game the following year, but suffered a severe back injury which left him paralyzed for two weeks and ruined his college athletic career. Following his injury, he turned his attention to acting and performed in plays at the Pioneer Playhouse in Danville, Kentucky. Majors graduated from Eastern Kentucky in 1962 with a degree in history and physical education. He planned to be a football coach. 

After college, he received an offer to try out for the St. Louis Cardinals football team. Instead, he moved to Los Angeles and found work at the Los Angeles Park and Recreation Department as the recreation director for North Hollywood Park. In Los Angeles, Majors met many actors and industry professionals, including Dick Clayton, who had been James Dean's agent, and Clayton suggested he attend his acting school. After one year of acting school, Clayton felt that Majors was ready to start his career. At this time, he picked up the stage name Lee Majors as a tribute to childhood hero Johnny Majors who was a player and future coach for the University of Tennessee. Majors also studied at Estelle Harman's acting school at MGM.

Career

Early roles
At age 25, Majors landed his first, although uncredited, role in Strait-Jacket (1964), as the cheating husband of a character enacted by Joan Crawford. After appearing in a 1965 episode of Gunsmoke, he starred later that year as Howard White in an episode of The Alfred Hitchcock Hour, "The Monkey's Paw – A Retelling", based on the short story by W. W. Jacobs.

Majors got his big break when he was chosen out of over 400 young actors, including Burt Reynolds, for the co-starring role of Heath Barkley in a new ABC western series, The Big Valley, which starred Barbara Stanwyck. Also starring on the show was another newcomer, Linda Evans, who played Heath's younger sister, Audra. Richard Long and Peter Breck played his brothers Jarrod and Nick, respectively. One of Heath's frequently used expressions during the series was "Boy howdy!" Big Valley was an immediate hit. During the series, Majors co-starred in the 1968 Charlton Heston film Will Penny, for which he received an "Introducing" credit, and landed the lead role in The Ballad of Andy Crocker (1969), a made-for-television film which was first broadcast by ABC. The film was one of the first films to deal with the subject matter of Vietnam veterans "coming home". That same year, he was offered the chance to star in Midnight Cowboy (1969), but The Big Valley was renewed for another season and he was forced to decline the role (which later went to Jon Voight). When The Big Valley was cancelled in 1969, he signed a long-term contract with Universal Studios. In 1970, Majors appeared in William Wyler's final movie The Liberation of L.B. Jones, and joined the cast of The Virginian for its final season when the show was restructured as "The Men From Shiloh" featuring four alternating leads. Majors played new ranch hand Roy Tate.

Majors was called a "blond Elvis Presley" because of his resemblance to Elvis during this period of his career.

1970s: The Six Million Dollar Man

In 1971, he landed the role of Arthur Hill's partner, Jess Brandon, on Owen Marshall: Counselor at Law, which garnered critical acclaim during its three seasons on ABC.

Majors's co-starring role on Owen Marshall led him to a starring role as United States Air Force Colonel Steve Austin, an ex-astronaut with bionic implants in The Six Million Dollar Man, a 1973 television movie broadcast on ABC. In 1974, the network decided to turn it into a weekly series. The series became an international success, being screened in over 70 countries, turning Majors into a pop icon. Majors also made his directorial debut in 1975, on an episode called "One of Our Running Backs Is Missing" which co-starred professional football players such as Larry Csonka and Dick Butkus.

In 1977, with The Six Million Dollar Man still a hit series, Majors tried to renegotiate his contract with Universal Television. The studio in turn filed a lawsuit to force him to report to work due to stipulations within his existing contract that had not yet expired. It was rumored that Majors was holding out for more money, but his manager denied this: according to him, Majors was fighting to have his own production company, Fawcett Majors Productions, brought on as an independent producer in association with Universal in order to make the company viable. After Majors did not report to work that June, studio executives ultimately relented. However, ratings began to decline and The Six Million Dollar Man was cancelled in 1978 (as was The Bionic Woman). In November 2010, Time-Life released a 40 DVD set featuring every episode and bonus features from the show.

He also appeared in several films during the 1970s. The TV movie Francis Gary Powers: The True Story of the U-2 Spy Incident (1976, as Francis Gary Powers), the Viking film The Norseman (1978) co-starring Cornel Wilde, the horror thriller Killer Fish (1979), the drama  Steel (1979), which he produced, co-starring Jennifer O'Neill and Art Carney, and the political thriller Agency (1980), starring Robert Mitchum.

1980s: The Fall Guy
In 1981, Majors returned in another long-running television series. Producer Glen A. Larson (who had first worked with Majors on Alias Smith and Jones, where Majors guest starred in one episode, and later on The Six Million Dollar Man) asked him to star in the pilot of The Fall Guy. Majors played Colt Seavers, a Hollywood stuntman who moonlights as a bounty hunter. Majors was also a producer and a director on the show, and even sang its theme song, the self-effacing "Unknown Stuntman." Majors would invite several longtime friends, Linda Evans, Peter Breck, Lindsay Wagner and Richard Anderson, to guest-star in various episodes. The series ran for five seasons until it was cancelled in 1986.

His 1980s films include the made-for-TV sequel High Noon, Part II: The Return of Will Kane (1980), playing Gary Cooper's original role, the science fiction film The Last Chase (1981), and the disaster movie Starflight: The Plane That Couldn't Land (1983). Between 1987 and 1994, Majors and Lindsay Wagner reunited in three The Six Million Dollar Man/The Bionic Woman TV movies.  Majors also made cameo appearances in Circle of Two (1980) and as himself in the 1988 holiday comedy Scrooged.

1990s–present

In 1990, he starred in the film Keaton's Cop, and had recurring roles in Tour of Duty and the short-lived 1992 series, Raven. He also had supporting roles in the films Trojan War (1997), Out Cold (2001), Big Fat Liar (2002), and The Brothers Solomon (2007). He voiced the character of "Big" Mitch Baker in the 2002 video game Grand Theft Auto: Vice City. He played Jaret Reddick's disconnected father in Bowling For Soup's 2007 video, "When We Die". That same year, he played Grandpa Max in Ben 10: Race Against Time, and voiced a character on the APTN animated children's program Wapos Bay: The Series that was named "Steve from Austin". He also played a minor role in Stephen King's The Mist.

Majors played Coach Ross on the CW Network television series The Game, which ran from October 1, 2006, to May 20, 2009.

Majors appeared in the role of God in "Jim Almighty" a 2007 episode of According to Jim. He later returned to the role in that show's 2009 series finale, "Heaven Opposed to Hell". Also in 2008, Majors played a member of the Minutemen (dedicated to preventing illegal border crossings) in season four of the Showtime series Weeds, where he recruits Kevin Nealon's character. Majors reprised his role (voice only) as Col. Steve Austin in the "Bionic Woman" segment of the Robot Chicken season four episode "Love, Maurice" (2009).

In March 2010, Majors played the crusty sailing instructor in the Community episode "Beginner Pottery". In April 2010, he appeared as the mentor of the series lead in "Christopher Chance", the 12th episode of Human Target. Later that year, he provided the voice of General Abernathy in G.I. Joe: Renegades. He later reprised the role in a 2011 episode. In 2011, he appeared as "Rockwell" in Jerusalem Countdown. From 2011 to 2014 he appeared in three episodes of the Fox comedy Raising Hope, as Burt's father, Ralph. On February 1, 2013, it was announced that Majors would appear in a two-episode guest spot in season two of TNT's Dallas as Ken Richards, an old flame of Sue Ellen's. In 2015, he appeared as J.D. in the faith-based drama Do You Believe? and the hip-hop dance-themed series Avengers of eXtreme Illusions. Majors appeared in the second and third seasons of Ash vs Evil Dead as Brock Williams, the father of Ash Williams (Bruce Campbell). In late 2018, Majors voiced an animated Six Million Dollar Man action figure in an advertisement for Honda's "Happy Honda Days" sale event. In 2019, Majors voiced Jeff Tracy in Thunderbirds Are Go.

Personal life

Marriages
 Kathy Robinson (married 1961, divorced 1964) – One child together, Lee Majors Jr. (born April 8, 1962), who later became an actor and appeared alongside his father in the three Six Million Dollar Man/Bionic Woman reunion telefilms, credited as Lee Majors II.
 Farrah Fawcett (married July 28, 1973, separated 1979, divorced February 16, 1982) – During the first six years of their marriage, she went by the name of Farrah Fawcett-Majors. Fawcett died on June 25, 2009. Majors recorded a one-hit-wonder song, Unknown Stuntman, that makes reference to her.
 Karen Velez (married 1988, divorced 1994) – Playboy Playmate; one daughter, Nikki Loren, and twin sons, Dane Luke and Trey Kulley. 
 Faith Noelle Cross (married on November 1, 2002) – actress and model.

Health
In 2003, Majors had heart bypass surgery.

Los Angeles Express
In April 1983, Majors became part owner of the LA Express of the United States Football League.

Popular culture
The song "Midnight Train to Georgia" was inspired by Lee Majors and Farrah Fawcett.  Songwriter Jim Weatherly phoned his friend Majors one day, and the call was answered by Fawcett. Weatherly and Fawcett chatted briefly and she told him she was going to visit her mother and was taking "the midnight plane to Houston." Although Majors and Fawcett were both successful by that time, Weatherly used them as "characters" in his song about a failed actress who leaves Los Angeles, and is followed by her boyfriend who cannot live without her. Eventually the genders were swapped, the plane became a train, and Houston was changed to Georgia. The recording by Gladys Knight & The Pips went to Number One in 1973.

In the 1994 The Simpsons episode "Burns' Heir", Marge Simpson fantasizes about running off with Majors.

The title of the Beastie Boys song "Lee Majors Come Again" is a reference to Majors.

Filmography

Film

Television

Video games

References

External links

1939 births
Living people
20th-century American male actors
21st-century American male actors
American adoptees
American male film actors
American male soap opera actors
American male television actors
American male voice actors
Eastern Kentucky University alumni
Male actors from Detroit
Male actors from Kentucky
People from Middlesboro, Kentucky
People from Richmond, Kentucky
People from Wyandotte, Michigan